Sir Drue Drury (c. 1531 – 29 April 1617) was the son of Sir Robert Drury (c. 1503 – 1577), the grandson of Sir Robert Drury (c. 1456 – 2 March 1535), Speaker of the House of Commons, and the nephew of Sir William Drury. He was an English courtier and politician who sat in the House of Commons at various times between 1562 and 1584.

Early life
Drury was the fifth but third surviving son of Sir Robert Drury (c. 1503 – 1577) of Hedgerley, Buckinghamshire, and Elizabeth Brudenell, the daughter of Edmund Brudenell of Chalfont St Peter, Buckinghamshire. He was the grandson of Sir Robert Drury (c. 1456 – 2 March 1535), Speaker of the House of Commons in 1495. He was a brother of Sir Robert Drury (1525–1593) and Sir William Drury (2 October 1527 – 13 October 1579).

Drury matriculated from St Edmund's Hostel, Cambridge in Autumn 1544.

Public life
Drury was elected Member of Parliament for Mitchell in 1559 and for Camelford in 1562. He was High Sheriff of Norfolk in 1576. During the reigns of Elizabeth and James I he was gentleman usher of the privy chamber. He seems to have kept in the good graces of the queen, except on one occasion. In September 1579 he was knighted at Wanstead, Essex. He was elected MP for Norfolk in 1584. and appointed custos rotulorum for the county in 1583. In November 1586 he was sent to Fotheringay to assist Sir Amias Paulet in the wardership of Mary, Queen of Scots. He was nominated Lieutenant of the Tower of London in 1596.

Drury died at his seat at Riddlesworth, Norfolk, aged about eighty-six, though on his monument the age of ninety-nine is given. His will of 7 July 1613 was proved in P.C.C. 31 May 1617 (registered 39, Weldon).

William Camden described Drury as a sincere, honest man, and a puritan in his religion.

Family
Drury married, firstly, Elizabeth, daughter of Sir Philip Calthorpe, and widow of Sir William Woodhouse of Waxham, Norfolk. She brought him a moiety of Riddlesworth. In 1582 he married for his second wife Katherine Finch, daughter and heiress of William Finch of Lynsted, Kent. Through her, he acquired the manor of Sewards in Linstead, and Perry Court at Preston, Kent. He had an only son, Drue Drury, who was created a baronet and three daughters; Elizabeth who married Sir Thomas Wingfield and then Henry Reynolds, Anne who married Sir Robert Boteler, and Frances. Drury was a younger brother of Sir William Drury.

Some correspondence between Drury and his second wife and Sir Julius Cæsar, which was written in 1588, 1596, and 1603–1614, is held in the Lansdowne collection in the British Library.

Drury is to be distinguished from a Drue Drury of Eccles and Rollesby, Norfolk, who married Anne, daughter and coheiress of Thomas Burgh, 3rd Baron Burgh, and was knighted at Whitehall on 23 July 1603, before the coronation of King Charles I.

Notes

References
 

1531 births
1617 deaths
Court of Elizabeth I
Members of the Parliament of England for Camelford
Members of the Parliament of England for Mitchell
English MPs 1559
English MPs 1563–1567
English MPs 1584–1585
High Sheriffs of Norfolk
Lieutenants of the Tower of London
People from Breckland District
Members of the Parliament of England for Norfolk